Andreas J. Bäumler is a professor in the Department of Medical Microbiology and Immunology at the University of California, Davis School of Medicine, in Davis, California. Bäumler studies the molecular mechanisms of Salmonella interaction with the intestinal mucosa. He is one of the leading researchers in the field of Salmonella research and has several highly cited publications on the topic of Salmonella infection, immunity to Salmonella, and the interactions between the host, the pathogen, and the intestinal microbiota during infection. Bäumler has a B.S. and a Ph.D. in Microbiology from University of Tübingen, Germany. Since 2010 Bäumler is a fellow of the American Academy of Microbiology and since 2020 of the Leopoldina. He is Editor in Chief of the scientific journal "Infection and Immunity." In 2021 he was awarded the Robert Koch Award for his pioneering work in understanding the regulation of the composition and function of our microflora by the cells of the intestinal epithelium.

Research
The Bäumler lab studies the human disease manifestations associated with Salmonella serotypes such as typhoid fever caused by Salmonella typhi and gastroenteritis caused by non-typhoidal Salmonella serotypes (e.g. S. Typhimurium). One focus of Bäumler's research is to understand why typhoid fever and gastroenteritis differ in the host response elicited at the site where both infections originate, the intestinal mucosa. The Bäumler lab aims to understand what Salmonella virulence factors and host factors contribute to the different disease manifestations caused by different serotypes of Salmonella.

References

German microbiologists
University of California, Davis faculty
Living people
Year of birth missing (living people)
Fellows of the American Academy of Microbiology